Seguenzia lineata is a species of extremely small deep water sea snail, a marine gastropod mollusk in the family Seguenziidae.

Description
The height of the shell attains 4.6 mm.

Distribution
This species occurs in the Caribbean Sea off Yucatan, Mexico, and in the Atlantic Ocean off Brazil at depths between 640 m and 1234 m.

References

External links
 To Biodiversity Heritage Library (1 publication)
 To Encyclopedia of Life
 To World Register of Marine Species

lineata
Gastropods described in 1879